Elizabeth Dawson Baker is an American children's novelist who made her international debut in 2002 with The Frog Princess which was a Texas Lone Star Reading List Book, A Book Sense Children's Pick, a  Florida's Sunshine State Readers List pick and a 2006 Sasquatch Book Award nominee. The Frog Princess has also inspired a series of eight additional books based on it. The Frog Princess inspired the  2009 Disney film The Princess and the Frog.

Bibliography

Tales of the Frog Princess series
The Frog Princess (2002)    ~ Bloomsbury USA Childrens; New edition (August 26, 2014)
Dragon's Breath (2004)   ~ Bloomsbury USA Childrens; New edition (August 26, 2014)
Once Upon A Curse (2004)   ~  Bloomsbury USA Childrens; New edition (August 26, 2014)
No Place For Magic (2006)  ~  Bloomsbury USA Childrens; Reprint edition (August 26, 2014)
The Salamander Spell (2007)  ~  Bloomsbury USA Childrens; New edition (February 24, 2015)
The Dragon Princess (2008)  ~ Bloomsbury USA Childrens; New edition (February 24, 2015)
Dragon Kiss (2009)  ~ Bloomsbury USA Childrens; New edition (February 24, 2015)
A Prince Among Frogs (2009)  ~ Bloomsbury USA Childrens; New edition (February 24, 2015)
The Frog Princess Returns (2017)  ~  Bloomsbury USA Childrens (June 6, 2017)

The Wide-Awake Princess series 
 The Wide-Awake Princess (2010)  ~ Bloomsbury USA Childrens; Reprint edition (January 3, 2012)
 Unlocking the Spell [aka The Princess's Promise] (2012)  ~ Bloomsbury USA Childrens; Reprint edition (April 1, 2014)
 The Bravest Princess (2014)  ~  Bloomsbury USA Childrens; Reprint edition (February 24, 2015)
 Princess in Disguise (2015)  ~ Bloomsbury USA Childrens; Reprint edition (April 5, 2016)
 Princess Between Worlds (2016)  ~ Bloomsbury USA Childrens; Reprint edition (March 21, 2017)
 The Princess and the Pearl (2017)  ~ Bloomsbury USA Childrens; Reprint edition (March 20, 2018)
 Princess Before Dawn (2018)   ~ Bloomsbury USA Childrens (March 20, 2018)

The Fairy-Tale Matchmaker series 
 The Fairy-Tale Matchmaker (2014)  ~  Bloomsbury USA Childrens; Reprint edition (October 6, 2015)
 The Perfect Match (2015)  ~ Bloomsbury USA Childrens; Reprint edition (October 11, 2016)
 The True Heart (2016)   ~ Bloomsbury USA Childrens; Reprint edition (October 10, 2017)
 The Magical Match (2017)  ~ Bloomsbury Children's Books; Reprint edition (October 16, 2018)

Fairy Wings series 
 Fairy Wings [originally titled Wings: A Fairy Tale] (2008)  ~  Bloomsbury USA Childrens; 1 edition (February 14, 2012)
 Fairy Lies (2012)  ~ Bloomsbury USA Childrens; Reprint edition (August 6, 2013)

Magical Animal Rescue series 
 Maggie and the Flying Horse (2017)   ~  Bloomsbury USA Childrens (April 11, 2017)
 Maggie and the Wish Fish (2017)  ~  Bloomsbury USA Childrens (April 11, 2017)
 Maggie and the Unicorn (2017)  ~ Bloomsbury USA Childrens (October 3, 2017)
 Maggie and the Flying Pigs (2017)  ~ Bloomsbury USA Childrens (October 3, 2017)

Other books
A Question of Magic (2013)  ~ Bloomsbury USA Childrens; Reprint edition (August 4, 2015)

References

External links
 Author's official site
 Summaries of the Tales of the Frog Princess series

Living people
21st-century American novelists
American children's writers
Year of birth missing (living people)
American women novelists
Women science fiction and fantasy writers
21st-century American women writers